Óscar Rolando Hernández (nicknamed "Martillo", hammer in English) is a Honduran retired football forward.

Club career
Hernández played most of his senior career for F.C. Motagua in the Honduran league. He is currently the third best scorer for Motagua of all times with 66 goals. He also played for Marathón with whom he won a top goalscorer award and Atlético Portuario.

International career
Hernández has represented Honduras in 3 FIFA World Cup qualification matches.

Honours
 Motagua
 1968–69
 1970–71
 1973–74

 Individual
 Top goalscorer with Marathón in 1976–77

References

Living people
Honduran footballers
Honduras international footballers
F.C. Motagua players
C.D. Marathón players
Liga Nacional de Fútbol Profesional de Honduras players
1950 births
Association football forwards